This is a list of notable non-political figures and organizations who publicly indicated support for Hillary Clinton in the 2016 United States presidential election.

Those who indicated their support after Hillary Clinton's presumptive nomination on June 11 are denoted with an asterisk.

Notable individuals

Activists, humanitarians, and labor leaders 

 Marianne Williamson*

Journalists, commentators, and editors

Leaders in business

Scholars, critics, and academic administrators

Writers, artists, filmmakers, and producers 

Harvey Weinstein

Celebrities

Organizations

Business groups and private enterprises

Labor unions

Newspapers, magazines, and other media

Retracted endorsements 
 Farrah Abraham, TV personality
 Scott Adams, cartoonist, endorsed Johnson
 bell hooks, writer and activist
 Morrissey, singer-songwriter
 Douglas Schoen, political analyst and consultant

See also 
 List of Democrats who opposed Hillary Clinton presidential campaign, 2016
 List of Hillary Clinton presidential campaign political endorsements, 2016
 List of Bernie Sanders presidential campaign endorsements, 2016
 List of Donald Trump presidential campaign endorsements, 2016
 List of Gary Johnson presidential campaign endorsements, 2016
 List of Hillary Clinton presidential campaign endorsements, 2008
 List of Jill Stein presidential campaign endorsements, 2016
 List of Republicans who opposed Donald Trump presidential campaign, 2016

Notes

References 

Endorsements, non-political
Clinton, Hillary, non-political
Clinton, Hillary, 2016, non-political